Columbia State Community College is a public community college in Columbia, Tennessee. Founded in 1966, it serves nine counties in southern Middle Tennessee through five campuses. It is accredited by the Southern Association of Colleges and Schools Commission on Colleges to award Associate of Arts, Associate of Science, Associate of Science in Teaching, Associate of Fine Arts, and Associate of Applied Science degrees, and technical certificates.

Academics
Columbia State grants Associate of Arts, Associate of Science, Associate of Science in Teaching, Associate of Fine Arts, and Associate of Applied Science degrees, and technical certificates.

The college is organized into the following academic divisions: Health Sciences; Humanities and Social Sciences; and Science, Technology & Mathematics. The college offers more than 70 programs of study.

Transfer information 
Students entering a community college in Tennessee who select a major within the Tennessee Transfer Pathways complete required courses and earn an associate degree can transition seamlessly as a junior to any Tennessee public university, or at participating Tennessee independent colleges and universities. All earned credit hours will apply toward a bachelor's degree in the same discipline.

Columbia State has partnerships with area universities to offer bachelor's and master's degree programs on a Columbia State campus. The schools and programs offered are:
Middle Tennessee State University
Bachelor's degree in Agribusiness
Bachelor's degree in Interdisciplinary Studies (K-6)
Master's degree in Education
Education Specialist, Ed.S.
Tennessee Tech University
Bachelor's degree in Interdisciplinary Studies

Students and faculty
The average student age is 22.4 years old. In Fall 2018, 60% of students were female. The number of students enrolled in Fall 2018 was 6,221. The college employs more than 520 people, consisting of 362 faculty members.

Demographics
 81% Caucasian
 7% African-American
 6% Hispanic
 2% Asian American or Pacific Islander
 0.09% Native American

Sports, clubs, and traditions
The school is a TCCAA and National Junior College Athletic Association (NJCAA) member and fields baseball, softball, women's soccer, and men's and women's basketball teams in intercollegiate competition. Scholarships are offered for those sports.

The men's basketball team won the 2015 TCCAA championship and have competed in the 2012, 2014 and 2015 NJCAA Men's National Basketball Tournament. The baseball team was named the 2012 TCCAA champions, 2011 and 2013 NJCAA Region VII champions and has competed in the NJCAA Junior College Baseball World Series 13 times, most recently in 2014.

Columbia State also offers intramural sports in basketball, flag football, ultimate frisbee and more.

Columbia State has a variety of student groups including the Student Government Association, President's Leadership Society, Charger Student Radiographer Organization, North American Veterinary Technician Association, Phi Theta Kappa, Respiratory Care Crew, Sigma Kappa Delta, Student Nursing Association, the STEM Club, study abroad, and more.

References

External links
Official website

Community colleges in Tennessee
Buildings and structures in Columbia, Tennessee
Educational institutions established in 1966
Universities and colleges accredited by the Southern Association of Colleges and Schools
Education in Maury County, Tennessee
Education in Williamson County, Tennessee
Education in Lawrence County, Tennessee
Education in Marshall County, Tennessee
Education in Wayne County, Tennessee
Buildings and structures in Williamson County, Tennessee
Buildings and structures in Lawrence County, Tennessee
Buildings and structures in Marshall County, Tennessee
Buildings and structures in Wayne County, Tennessee
1966 establishments in Tennessee
NJCAA athletics